Igor Arrieta Lizarraga (born 8 December 2002) is a Spanish cyclist, who currently rides for UCI ProTeam .

Major results

Road

2019
 National Junior Road Championships
2nd Road race
2nd Time trial
 8th Gipuzkoa Klasika
 10th Gent–Wevelgem Juniors
2020
 2nd Time trial, National Junior Road Championships
 5th Gipuzkoa Klasika
 10th Time trial, UEC European Junior Road Championships
2021
 1st  Time trial, National Under-23 Road Championships
 1st Overall 
1st Stages 2 & 3
 2nd 
 3rd 
2022
 6th Overall Vuelta a Asturias
 7th Overall O Gran Camiño
1st  Young rider classification

Cyclo-cross

2018–2019
 3rd Vic Juniors
 3rd Manlleu Juniors
2019–2020
 1st  National Junior Championships
 1st Igorre Juniors
 1st Karrantza Juniors
 1st Valencia Juniors
 1st Xativa Juniors
 1st Pontevedra Juniors
 1st Trofeo San Andres Juniors

References

External links

2002 births
Living people
Spanish male cyclists
Cyclists from Navarre
Cyclo-cross cyclists
People from Barranca (comarca)